Chelodina, collectively known as snake-necked turtles, is a large and diverse genus of long-necked chelid turtles with a complicated nomenclatural history. Although in the past, Macrochelodina and Macrodiremys have been considered separate genera and prior to that all the same, they are now considered subgenera of the Chelodina, further Macrochelodina and Macrodiremys are now known to apply to the same species, hence Chelydera is used for the northern snake-necked turtles.

Chelodina is an ancient group of chelid turtles native to Australia, New Guinea, the Indonesian Rote Island, and East Timor. The turtles within this subgenus are small to medium-sized with oval shaped carapace. They are side-necked turtles, meaning they tuck their head partially around the side of their body when threatened instead of directly backwards.

Chelydera represents those species that have often been termed the Chelodina B group or thick necked snake neck turtles. The subgenus was described in 2020 by Thomson & Georges (in Shea et al. 2020). They are a side-neck turtle of the family Chelidae with extremely long necks and long flattened heads. They are specialist fish eaters using a strike and gape mode of feeding. The first fossils (C. (Chelydera) alanrixi) are known from Queensland from the Eocene period (Lapparent de Broin, F. de, & Molnar, R. E., 2001).

Macrochelodina (Wells & Wellington, 1985) is a monotypic subgenus of the Chelodina. Its sole member is the enigmatic Chelodina (Macrochelodina) oblonga from Western Australia.

Taxonomy
Current taxonomy follows that of Georges & Thomson, 2010 with updates from van Dijk et al. 2014 and Shea et al. 2020.

Synonymous names for the Chelodina Fitzinger 1826 genus include: Hydraspis Bell 1828, Chelyodina Agassiz 1846:79 (nomen novum), Hesperochelodina Wells and Wellington 1985 (nomen nudum).

The type species for the Chelodina subgenus is Chelodina longicollis (Shaw, 1794). The type species for the Chelydera subgenus is Chelodina parkeri Rhodin and Mittermeier 1976. The type species for Macrochelodina is Chelodina oblonga Gray 1841.

List of species

Extinct species

There are three identified extinct species of Chelodina:
Chelodina alanrixi de Broin and Molnar, 2001 is a species of snake-necked fossil turtle which was described in 2001 using material gathered in Redbank Plains, Queensland, Australia. It is a member of the Chelidae Pleurodira. The fossil has been dated to the Eocene Epoch.
Chelodina insculpta de Vis, 1897 is an extinct species of snake-necked turtle that was described in 1897 from material gathered in Darling Downs, Queensland, Australia, restricted. It is a member of the Chelidae; Pleurodira. The fossil has been dated as Pliocene to Pleistocene.
Chelodina murrayi Yates, 2013 is an extinct species of snake-necked turtle from the Waite Formation on the Alcoota Scientific Reserve, north-east of Alice Springs in the Northern Territory of Australia. The species would appear to belong to the Chelodina novaeguineae group of species within the subgenus Chelodina.

Notes

References

External links

Overview of the genus Chelodina with original literature

 
Turtles of Australia
Turtle genera
Taxa named by Leopold Fitzinger